Keith P. Brown (born July 17, 1968) is an American politician from the state of New York. A Republican, he is currently serving in the New York State Assembly, representing the 12th district, which encompasses portions of the towns of Babylon, Huntington, and Islip within Suffolk County. He assumed office in January 2021.

Political career 
While a college student, Brown was an intern for then-state senator Norman Levy.

Brown was selected by Suffolk County Republicans as their nominee for a special election scheduled for April 28, 2020 that was postponed to due to the COVID-19 pandemic. Brown defeated Democratic challenger Michael Marcantonio in 2020, and Marcantonio, who believed mail-in ballots could hand him a tight victory, conceded the race 16 days after election day. The final vote total was 35,190 for Brown and 33,027 for Marcantonio. Brown assumed office on January 2021.

Personal life 
Brown is a graduate of SUNY Albany and Touro Law Center. He is a resident of Northport, New York, and lives with his wife, Barbara, and their 3 children.

References 

Living people
1968 births
People from New York (state)
Republican Party members of the New York State Assembly